The 1994–95 Ukrainian Hockey League season was the third season of the Ukrainian Hockey League, the top level of ice hockey in Ukraine. Seven teams participated in the league, and HC Sokil Kyiv won the championship.

First round

Final round

External links
1994-95 Standings and results. Ukrainian Ice Hockey Federation

UKHL
Ukrainian Hockey Championship seasons
Ukr